Kastrychnitski District is an administrative subdivision of the city of Minsk, Belarus. It was named after the October Revolution.

Geography
The district is situated in central and south-western area of the city and borders with Leninsky and Maskowski districts.

Transport

The main railway station of Minsk is located in the district. The district is also crossed by the subway and tram networks. It is also crossed by the MKAD beltway.

References

External links
 Kastrychnitski District official website

Districts of Minsk